Sorolopha saitoi is a moth of the family Tortricidae. It is found in Thailand and Vietnam.

References

Moths described in 1989
Olethreutini
Moths of Asia